The golden-bellied warbler has been split into two species:
 Cuzco warbler, Myiothlypis chrysogaster
 Choco warbler, Myiothlypis chlorophrys

Birds by common name